The 1990 Ottawa Rough Riders finished 3rd place in the East Division with a 7–11 record. They were defeated in the East Semi-Final by the Toronto Argonauts.

Offseason

CFL draft

Preseason

Regular season

Season standings

Regular season

Schedule

Postseason

Awards and honours

1990 CFL All-Stars

References

Ottawa Rough Riders seasons